Solntsevo is a station on the Kalininsko-Solntsevskaya line of the Moscow Metro. It opened On August 30, 2018 as part of line's Ramenki-Rasskazovka extension.

The station is in the Solntsevo District of Moscow. The name Solntsevo dates to 1938 when a dacha community was built on the site. Solntsevo was absorbed by the city of Moscow in 1984.

References

Moscow Metro stations
Kalininsko-Solntsevskaya line
Railway stations in Russia opened in 2018
Railway stations located underground in Russia